Nadia Rose (born 11 June 1993) is a British rapper and songwriter from Croydon, London.

Education
Rose studied Music and Music Management at university.

Career
Rose released her debut EP Highly Flammable on 13 January 2017 following the successful singles "Station", "BOOM", and "D.F.W.T".  Rose is represented by Sony Music Group under the subsidiary Relentless Records. She came fifth in the BBC's 'Sound of 2017' shortlist. In 2018 she released the track WUT2 and appeared in a Stella McCartney catwalk show in Milan.

In 2020, Rose revealed that she had been unable to release new music because of her label. Rose collaborated with Melanie C on the track "Fearless" for Melanie C's self-titled album, Melanie C. The music video had a world premiere on 16 September 2020. Of the collaboration, Rose stated: "“It’s no secret that I’m a super Spice Girls fan so this whole experience has been very surreal."

Personal life
Rose is a cousin of Stormzy. 

In 2019, Rose took part in an Operation Black Vote campaign to encourage people from ethnic minority communities to register to vote in the 2019 UK General Election. Rose also took part in the 2019 Grime4Corbyn campaign in support of the Labour Party and its leader Jeremy Corbyn. Rose wrote an article for Metro encouraging people to vote Labour in the election.

Discography

Extended plays

Singles

References

1993 births
Singers from London
Rappers from London
Living people
Black British women rappers
English women rappers
People from Croydon
Relentless Records artists